Manoj Barik (born 12 June 1989) is an Indian cricketer. He made his Twenty20 debut for Odisha in the 2015–16 Syed Mushtaq Ali Trophy on 4 January 2016.

References

External links
 

1989 births
Living people
Indian cricketers
Odisha cricketers
Sportspeople from Bhubaneswar
Cricketers from Odisha